Mansour Benothmane (born August 7, 1997 in Tiaret) is an Algerian footballer who is currently playing as a midfielder for MC El Eulma in the Algerian Ligue 2.

Benothmane is an Algeria under-20 international.

Club career
On November 26, Benothmane made his senior debut for Club Africain in a league match against CS Hammam-Lif, scoring a goal just a few minutes after coming onto the pitch.

References

External links
 

1997 births
People from Tiaret
Algeria youth international footballers
Algerian footballers
Algerian expatriate sportspeople in Tunisia
JSM Tiaret players
ES Sétif players
Club Africain players
Expatriate footballers in Tunisia
Living people
Tunisian Ligue Professionnelle 1 players
Association football forwards
21st-century Algerian people